KPCA may refer to:

 KPCA-LP, a low-power radio station (103.3 FM) licensed to serve Petaluma, California, United States
 Kernel principal component analysis